Strathmore Football Club, usually referred to as Strathmore (Arbroath) to distinguish from Dundee Strathmore, was a Scottish association football club based in the town of Arbroath, Angus.

History

The club was founded in 1879 and competed in the Scottish Cup for five seasons between 1883 and 1888.  Its best run was in 1885–86, reaching the fourth round, made up that season of 19 clubs.  In the fourth round, the club put up a struggle at Abercorn F.C., equalizing an early Abercorn goal and having another disallowed; at half-time, the Strathie was still in the game, at 2–1 down, but Abercorn scored another five goals before Strathmore concluded the scoring with a late consolation.

The club's biggest competitive win came in its first tie in the first Forfarshire Cup in 1883, beating the Clydesdale (Dundee) club 13–0. In the 1884–85 edition of the Forfarshire Cup, the club reached the final, against Dundee Harp.  The original match, at Rollo's Pier, the home of the Strathmore (Dundee) club, saw the Arbroath side take two goal lead early on, but visibly tired and was lucky to hang on to a draw.  The replay at the same venue, like the original match, attracted a crowd of 8,000.  Strathmore was unlucky to lose the toss, and had to play in the first half into a wind and with the sun shining in the goalkeeper's face, but even those factors could not explain going in at half-time 8–0 down.  The match ended 15–1.

The club's last Scottish Cup tie was a 13–1 defeat to Dundee East End F.C. at Damley Park in 1887, before a "rather small attendance", the result "being a foregone conclusion"; in January 1888, the club was a last-minute replacement for the Edinburgh Athenians for a friendly at Strathmore (Dundee), which the home side won 5–0, and no more is heard of the Arbroath side.

Colours

From 1880 to 1884, the club wore navy blue shirts and white shorts, and reversed the colours from 1884 to 1886.  In 1886, the club changed to black and gold striped shirts with navy blue shorts.

Ground

The club originally played on the Low Common in Arbroath. From 1883 the club played at Damley Park.

Notable players

John Petrie played for the club before joining Arbroath.

External links

Scottish Cup results

References 

Defunct football clubs in Scotland
Association football clubs established in 1879
1879 establishments in Scotland
Association football clubs disestablished in 1888
1888 disestablishments in Scotland
Football clubs in Angus, Scotland
Arbroath